In enzymology, a Latia-luciferin monooxygenase (demethylating) is an enzyme that catalyzes the chemical reaction

Latia luciferin + AH2 + 2 O2  oxidized Latia luciferin + CO2 + formate + A + H2O + hnu

The 3 substrates of this enzyme are Latia luciferin, an electron acceptor AH2, and O2, whereas its 6 products are oxidized Latia luciferin, CO2, formate, the reduction product A, H2O, and hn.

This enzyme belongs to the family of oxidoreductases, specifically those acting on paired donors, with O2 as oxidant and incorporation or reduction of oxygen. The oxygen incorporated need not be derive from O miscellaneous.  The systematic name of this enzyme class is Latia-luciferin,hydrogen-donor:oxygen oxidoreductase (demethylating). Other names in common use include luciferase (Latia luciferin), and Latia luciferin monooxygenase (demethylating).  It has 2 cofactors: FAD,  and Flavoprotein.

References

 
 

EC 1.14.99
Flavoproteins
Enzymes of unknown structure